The Sulawesi dwarf cuscus (Strigocuscus celebensis) is a species of arboreal marsupial in the family Phalangeridae that is endemic to Sulawesi and nearby islands in Indonesia. It inhabits tropical moist lowland forest and is nocturnal, folivorous and usually found in pairs. S. celebensis is threatened by hunting and deforestation.

References

Possums
Mammals of Sulawesi
Mammals described in 1858
Taxa named by John Edward Gray
Taxonomy articles created by Polbot